This is a list of homicides in Michigan. This list includes notable homicides committed in the U.S. state of Michigan that have a Wikipedia article on the killing, the  killer, or the victim.  It is divided into three subject areas as follows:
 Multiple homicides - homicides having multiple victims, including incidents involving race riots, mass killings involving organized crime, familicides, a school bombing, a school shooting, a post office shooting,and spree killers.
 Serial killers - persons who murder three or more persons with the incidents taking place over more than a month and including a significant period of time between them
 Single homicides - notable homicides involving a single fatality

Multiple homicides
Listed in chronological order

Serial killers
Listed in chronological order by date of earliest homicide

Single homicides

References 

Death-related lists
Killings in the United States
Michigan-related lists
Murder in Michigan
History of Michigan